The 1942 Newcastle-under-Lyme by-election was a by-election held for the British House of Commons constituency of Newcastle-under-Lyme on 11 March 1942.  The seat had become vacant when the Labour Member of Parliament (MP) Josiah Wedgwood was elevated to the peerage as Baron Wedgwood.  He had held the seat since the 1906 general election.

The Labour candidate, John Mack, was returned unopposed; during the Second World War the parties in the wartime coalition government had a pact not to contest by-elections in seats held.  He represented the constituency until he retired from the House of Commons at the 1951 general election.

See also
List of United Kingdom by-elections

References
 
 

1942 elections in the United Kingdom
By-elections to the Parliament of the United Kingdom in Staffordshire constituencies
Unopposed by-elections to the Parliament of the United Kingdom (need citation)
1942 in England
Politics of the Borough of Newcastle-under-Lyme
20th century in Staffordshire